Halium is a collaborative project to unify the Hardware Abstraction Layer for projects which run Linux on mobile devices with pre-installed Android. The project aims to standardize the middleware software used by various projects to talk with android daemons and make use of hardware on installed devices. It is distributed as free and open-source software under a mix of software licenses.

History 
The project was announced in 2017 and tried to pool developers from UBports, Sailfish OS community developers, the LuneOS project, KDE Plasma Mobile contributors, and among other developers to put an end to the fragmentation seen in their respective projects and achieve new goals jointly.

Features 
The project has a planning with an overall idea which stack includes the following:

Linux kernel
Android HAL
Sensors
Camera
RILd
Libhybris
Android HAL interfaces like Audioflingerglue and droidmedia
Build system and scripts
GPS - AGPS from Mozilla
Pulseaudio
Media codecs
oFono

See also
Anbox – a compatibility layer that allow mobile applications and games developed for Android to run on Linux
Android rooting
Linux for mobile devices
postmarketOS – replacement Linux-based OS for Android devices
List of custom Android firmware
LineageOS
Replicant – a completely free software variant of LineageOS, with all kernel blobs and non-free drivers removed
/e/ (operating system)
Comparison of mobile operating systems
List of open-source mobile phones

References

External links
 
 Halium Documentation
 Halium Official Telegram Group

Android (operating system)
Android forks
ARM operating systems
Capability systems
Custom Android firmware
Embedded Linux distributions
Embedded operating systems
Free mobile software
Free software operating systems
Mobile Linux
Smartphones
Software forks
Tablet operating systems